Amer Halilić (born 1 August 1998) is a Bosnian-Herzegovinian retired footballer.

Club career
Halilić was born in Germany, but moved to Canada at the age of three. He joined Edmonton-based FC Edmonton in 2014, before leaving to sign a professional contract with German side Wacker Nordhausen.

After failing to break into the first team of Wacker Nordhausen, he joined Polish Ekstraklasa side Korona Kielce. He signed for Bosnian-Herzegovinian side NK Vitez on loan in February 2018.

Career statistics

Club

Notes

Personal life
Since 2020, he works as a Sales Associate for a car dealer in Edmonton.

References

1998 births
Living people
People from Troisdorf
Sportspeople from Cologne (region)
Association football forwards
Bosnia and Herzegovina footballers
Canadian soccer players
FSV Wacker 90 Nordhausen players
Korona Kielce players
NK Vitez players
Regionalliga players
Premier League of Bosnia and Herzegovina players
Bosnia and Herzegovina expatriate footballers
Expatriate footballers in Poland
Bosnia and Herzegovina expatriate sportspeople in Poland